John Christopher Tynan (5 December 1925 – 23 August 2020) was a New Zealand field hockey player and cricketer. He represented New Zealand in field hockey between 1948 and 1956, including at the 1956 Olympic Games in Melbourne. He played four first-class cricket matches for Wellington between 1952 and 1954.

Tynan died on 23 August 2020.

References

External links

1925 births
2020 deaths
Field hockey players from Wellington City
New Zealand male field hockey players
Olympic field hockey players of New Zealand
Field hockey players at the 1956 Summer Olympics
New Zealand cricketers
Wellington cricketers
Cricketers from Wellington City